The following is an episode list for the MTV reality television series Rob Dyrdek's Fantasy Factory. The show follows the lives of professional skateboarder Rob Dyrdek, his cousin Drama, and the staff of The Fantasy Factory.

Series overview

{| class="wikitable" style="text-align:center;"
! style="padding:0 8px;" colspan="2" rowspan="2"| Season
! style="padding:0 8px;" rowspan="2"| Episodes
! style="padding:0 80px;" colspan="2"| Originally aired
! style="padding:0 65px;" colspan="1"| DVD release date
|-
! Season premiere
! Season finale
! Region 1
|-
|  style="background:#BBFFFF; color:#100; width:10px;"|
| 1
| 12
| 
| 
| September 1, 2009
|-
|  style="background:#AFEEEE; color:#100; width:10px;"|
| 2
| 9
| 
| 
| July 6, 2010
|-
|  style="background:#8EE5EE; color:#100; width:10px;"|
| 3
| 12
| 
| 
| August 9, 2011
|-
|  style="background:#00A1D7; color:#100; width:10px;"|
| 4
| 10
| 
| 
| August 28, 2012
|-
|  style="background:#33A1C9; color:#100; width:10px;"|
| 5
| 12
| 
| 
| July 24, 2012
|-
|  style="background:#6D9BF1; color:#100; width:10px;"|
| 6
| 9
| 
| 
| November 14, 2014
|-
|  style="background:#6D9BF1; color:#100; width:10px;"|
| 7
| 9
| 
| 
|
|-
|}

Episodes

Season 1 (2009)

Season 2 (2009)

Season 3 (2010)

Season 4 (2011)

Season 5 (2012)

Season 6 (2014)

Season 7 (2015)

References

Rob Dyrdek's Fantasy Factory episodes